Nottingham Forest Women Football Club is an English women's association football club affiliated with men's Nottingham Forest.

History
The first known existence of a female Forest team was that which competed in the Notts and Derby League in the early 1970s but the club in its current form was officially founded in 1990 by the NFFC Community arm and then developed by the players. The small group of young women advertised in the men's official programme against Everton for players to join them.

The current kit is sponsored by Showcase Cinemas.

The team picked up their first National League title in the 2007–08 season, winning the National League North following a 5–1 victory in their last game of the season against Sheffield Wednesday.  In 2010-11 they recorded their highest placing in the National League, then the top division of English women's football, finishing 2nd to Sunderland. They also reached the FA Women's Premier League Cup final in March 2011, but were defeated by Barnet on penalties.

They currently play in the FA Women's National League Northern Division.

Forest Women applied to join the FA WSL in 2014, however were unsuccessful.

On 1 July 2019 the club changed its name from 'Nottingham Forest Ladies' to 'Nottingham Forest Women' and their logo dropped the word 'ladies' to become the same as the men's.

Stadium
Nottingham Forest Women have played their home matches at Eastwood C.F.C.  since February 2019.
The stadium has a capacity of 5000 including 500 seated and has a 3G pitch.

Prior to playing at Eastwood, they played at Carlton Town FC (Stoke Lane, Gedling, Nottinghamshire, NG4 2QS).
The club have also previously played at Greenwich Avenue, the home of Basford United F.C.

Seasons

 Season abandoned due to the COVID-19 pandemic.

Key

P – Played
W – Games won
D – Games drawn
L – Games lost
GF – Goals for
GA – Goals against
Pts – Points
Pos – Final position

WPL - Women's Premier League
WNL - Women's National League

R1 - Round 1
R2 - Round 2
R3 - Round 3
QF - Quarter Final
SF - Semi Final
F - Final
W - Winner

Current squad

Former players

Honours
FA Women's Premier League Northern Division: 1
2007-08

FA Women's National League Plate: 1
 2021-22

Players of the season

References

External links
Official site
The team/players
Interview with Beth Bailey, Captain of Nottingham Forest Ladies Football Team at the Nottingham FIFA World Cup Bid Submission event at Wembley(Video)

Nottingham Forest F.C.
Women's football clubs in England
Association football clubs established in 1990
1990 establishments in England
FA Women's National League teams